Rinascita (Italian: Rebirth) was a political and cultural magazine published in Rome, Italy between 1944 and March 1991. It was one of the media outlets of Italian Communist Party (PCI).

History and profile
Rinascita was founded in 1944. The founder was Palmiro Togliatti, the leader of the PCI. He launched the magazine upon his return to Italy from exile in Moscow. He also edited the magazine until his death in 1964. Rinascita, published on a monthly basis, was headquartered in Rome. It was an official organ of the PCI. 

Rinascita was established to serve as an ideological guide for militants and to revive the Marxist movement. The magazine described the party as the one, which had the most comprehensive vision of the nation's interests. It attempted to develop a connection between Gramsci and Stalin. Following the death of Stalin in 1953 Rinascita described him as the perfect example of Marxists.

One of the frequent topics featured in Rinascita was the resistance against Fascists. It also published a special issue about the resistance, and Gisella Floreanini was among the contributors to it.

From 1962 the magazine was published weekly. At the end of the 1980s Rinascita temporarily stopped publication due to the low circulation figures. It was soon relaunched, but again ceased publication in March 1991. Alberto Asor Rosa was the last editor of the magazine.

References

External links

1944 establishments in Italy
1991 disestablishments in Italy
Communist magazines
Cultural magazines
Defunct political magazines published in Italy
Italian-language magazines
Magazines established in 1944
Magazines disestablished in 1991
Magazines published in Rome
Marxist magazines
Monthly magazines published in Italy
Weekly magazines published in Italy